Frøskeland is a village in Sortland Municipality in Nordland county, Norway.

Geography
Frøskeland lies on the island of Langøya, at the innermost part of Eidsfjorden, on the west side of the Vikeid isthmus. County Road 820 from the town of Sortland to Bø Municipality passes through Frøskeland. County Road 821 to the village of Myre branches off from County Road 820 at Frøskeland and travels north across Frøskelandseid (the Frøskeland Isthmus) to Steinlandsfjord in Øksnes Municipality. Frøskeland is also the junction for County Road 885, which travels south along the east side of the Eidsfjorden to the villages of Holmstad, Sandnes, and the Hadsel Bridge.

Name
The name Frøskeland is believed to derive from the word frøskja, related to the verb fryse which means 'freeze'.

Industry and services
The concrete factory Vesterålsbetong AS (formerly Tingvoll Betong AS and SE Betong AS) is located in Frøskeland. Frøskeland had a post office until June 1, 1997.

References

Sortland
Villages in Nordland